Peter Kavka (born 20 November 1990) is a Slovak football retired footballer who last played for FC Košice.

References

External links
 
 MFK Košice profile 

1990 births
Living people
Slovak footballers
Association football defenders
FC VSS Košice players
FC Košice (2018) players
FC Sellier & Bellot Vlašim players
Expatriate footballers in the Czech Republic
MFK Zemplín Michalovce players
FC Lokomotíva Košice players
Slovak Super Liga players
2. Liga (Slovakia) players